Sparganothis umbrana is a species of moth of the family Tortricidae first described by William Barnes and August Busck in 1920. It is found in North America, including Alberta, Colorado, Iowa, Maryland, Nevada, New Brunswick, New Jersey, New York, Newfoundland, Ohio, Ontario, Oregon, Quebec, Saskatchewan, South Carolina and Vermont.

The wingspan is 18–19 mm.

The larvae been recorded feeding on Euphorbia esula. They roll the leaves of their host plant. They produce strands of silk with which they tie together the leaves and terminal portions to create a protected area for feeding.

References

Moths described in 1920
Sparganothis